Deudakala is a village development committee in Bardiya District in Lumbini Province of south-western Nepal. At the time of the 1991 Nepal census it had a population of 11,625 and had 1740 houses in the town. The village is home to the Tharu people. World famous chef, Juni Tharu is originally from the region.

References

Populated places in Bardiya District